USS Tautog may refer to the following ships of the United States Navy:

 , a  launched in 1940 and stricken from the Naval Vessel Register in 1959
 , a  launched in 1967 and stricken from the Naval Vessel Register in 1997

United States Navy ship names